Ratpert or Radbert is a masculine Germanic given name. It may refer to:

Ratpert (abbot of Saint Gall) (d. 782)
Ratpert of Nonantola (d. 839?), abbot
Radbert of Corbie (d. 865), Frankish theologian and writer
Ratpert of Saint Gall (d. c. 911), Benedictine historian and poet